|}

This is a list of electoral district results for the Victorian 1943 election.

Results by electoral district

Albert Park

Allandale

Ballarat 

 Preferences were not distributed.

Barwon

Benalla

Benambra

Bendigo

Boroondara

Brighton 

 Sitting member Ian Macfarlan returned to the UAP after winning the seat in the previous election as an Independent.

Brunswick

Bulla and Dalhousie

Carlton 

 Preferences were not distributed.

Castlemaine and Kyneton

Caulfield

Clifton Hill 

 Preferences were not distributed.

Coburg 

 Preferences were not distributed.

Collingwood

Dandenong

Dundas

Essendon

Evelyn

Flemington

Footscray

Geelong

Gippsland East

Gippsland North

Gippsland South

Gippsland West

Goulburn Valley

Grant

Gunbower

Hampden

Hawthorn

Heidelberg

Kara Kara and Borung

Kew

Korong and Eaglehawk 

 Preferences were not distributed.

Lowan 

 Hamilton Lamb was a prisoner-of-war at this time and was not opposed. He died on the Burma Railway on 7 December 1943. Confirmation of his death was not received until September 1944.

Maryborough and Daylesford

Melbourne

Mildura

Mornington

Northcote

Nunawading

Oakleigh

Ouyen 

 Preferences were not distributed.

Polwarth

Port Fairy and Glenelg

Port Melbourne

Prahran

Richmond

Rodney

St Kilda 

 Preferences were not distributed.

Stawell and Ararat

Swan Hill

Toorak

Upper Goulburn

Upper Yarra 

 Preferences were not distributed.

Walhalla

Wangaratta and Ovens

Waranga

Warrenheip and Grenville

Warrnambool

Williamstown

Wonthaggi

See also 

 1943 Victorian state election
 Members of the Victorian Legislative Assembly, 1943–1945

References 

Results of Victorian state elections
1940s in Victoria (Australia)